Glasgwm is a mountain in Gwynedd, Wales forming part of the Aran range in southern Snowdonia. It is one of the three Marilyns that make up the range, the others being Aran Fawddwy and Esgeiriau Gwynion. To the west is Maesglase and the Dyfi hills, while to the south-west lies Cadair Idris. To the south lies the Plynlimon range.

Craig Cywarch makes up the south face of Glasgwm. Its crags are very popular with rock climbers. A mountaineering club hut is found at the foot of the cliffs.

Glasgwm's summit sits on a large rocky knoll marked by a cairn. The high altitude lake of Llyn y Fign lies adjacent to the summit, and is one of the largest bodies of water adjacent to a 700m+ summit in England and Wales.

References

Brithdir and Llanfachreth
Mawddwy
Mountains and hills of Gwynedd
Mountains and hills of Snowdonia
Climbing areas of Wales
Hewitts of Wales
Marilyns of Wales
Nuttalls